Osiris Rodríguez Castillos (July 21, 1925 - October 10, 1996) was a Uruguayan writer, poet, composer and singer.

Discography

LP
Poems and songs Oriental ( Antar PLP 5018. Montevideo, 1962 )
The Outsider ( RCA Victor AVL 3663. Buenos Aires and Montevideo, 1966 )
Volume 3 ( plant KL 8703. Montevideo, 1969 )
Maroons ( Sondor 33132. Montevideo, 1973 )
Stone Birds (Sondor 33,151. Montevideo, Epic 1974, Buenos Aires, 1974 )

EP
Song for my river (Antar FP 33-035. Montevideo, 1963 )
Osiris ( Gold Laut 5000)

Reissues and compilations
Maroons ( Sondor 3132-2. 1996 )
Malevo Romance ( Fingerboard 155,380, Argentina. 1997 )
The Outsider (Ayuí / Tacuabé am41cd. 2008 )

Literary work
Lavalleja General Romance (1953)
Grillo nochero (1955)
"1904" Red Moon (1957)
Jacinto tenths Moon (1957)
Burial of Carnival (Freedom Gallery. 1960)
Cantos North and South (1962)
Song and Poetry (1974)
Life and Adventures of gaucho Wire (Alkali Editorial. 1979)
The New Adventures of gaucho Wire (1980)

20th-century Uruguayan poets
Uruguayan male poets
Uruguayan male short story writers
Uruguayan composers
Male composers
Uruguayan folklorists
Uruguayan male guitarists
Uruguayan songwriters
Male songwriters
1925 births
1996 deaths
Singers from Montevideo
20th-century Uruguayan male singers
20th-century guitarists
20th-century short story writers
20th-century Uruguayan male writers